Ioannis Liourdis (Greek: Ιωάννης Λιούρδης, ca. 1800 in Pyrgos - 1899) was a Greek politician.

He was born in Pyrgos around 1800 and descended from an old family of Pyrgos which had Frankish roots. He was politician and lived in Athens.  He participated in the large farmers' protests against taxes in 1894. The city of Pyrgos honoured him by naming a street after him.  He died in 1899 and is buried in the First Cemetery of Athens.

References
Davos, Vyronas, Ston Pyrgo kai stin Ileia tou 1821-1830 (Στον Πύργο και στην Ηλεία του 1821-1930 = In Pyrgos And In Ilia In 1821-1830), Athens 1996
Davos, Vyronas Ta stafidika tis Ileias (1827-1997) (Τα σταφιδικά της Ηλείας (1827-1997) = The Vineyards Of Ilia (1827-1997)), Athens 19896

1800 births
1899 deaths
People from Pyrgos, Elis
Politicians from Elis
Year of birth uncertain